Angiras is a Vedic sage who formulated the fourth Veda.

Angiras may also refer to:
 Angiras Ghora, identified by some scholars as Neminatha, twenty-second tirthankara in Jainism
 Angiras Brahmin, a caste